The 2009 Porsche Tennis Grand Prix was a women's tennis tournament, for the first time played on indoor clay courts. It was the 32nd edition of the Porsche Tennis Grand Prix, and was part of the Premier tournaments of the 2009 WTA Tour. It took place at the Porsche Arena in Stuttgart, Germany, from 27 April through 3 May 2009. Svetlana Kuznetsova won the singles title.

Entrants

Seeds

 Rankings as of April 27, 2009.

Other entrants
The following players received wildcards into the main draw:

  Sabine Lisicki
  Anna-Lena Grönefeld

The following players received entry from the qualifying draw:

  Tsvetana Pironkova
  Alberta Brianti
  Karolina Šprem
  Andrea Petkovic

Finals

Singles

 Svetlana Kuznetsova defeated  Dinara Safina, 6–4, 6–3
 It was Kuznetsova's first title of the year and 10th of her career.

Doubles

 Bethanie Mattek-Sands /  Nadia Petrova defeated  Gisela Dulko /  Flavia Pennetta, 5–7, 6–3, 10–7

External links
 Official website

Porsche Tennis Grand Prix
Porsche Tennis Grand Prix
2009 in German tennis
2000s in Baden-Württemberg
Porsch